USS Stark County (LST-1134) was an  in the United States Navy during World War II. She was transferred to the Royal Thai Navy as HTMS Pangan (LST-13).

Construction and commissioning 
LST-1134 was laid down on 18 December 1944 at Chicago Bridge & Iron Company, Seneca, illonois. Launched on 16 March 1945 and commissioned on 7 April 1945.

Service in United States Navy 
She was commissioned too late to see service in World War II but was assigned to occupation service in the Far East from 15 September 1945 to 4 January 1946.

During the Korean War, she participated in the invasion of Inchon from 13 to 17 September 1950.

On 1 July 1955, she was given the name USS Stark County.

She was decommissioned on 16 May 1966 and transferred to the Royal Thai Navy.

LST-1134 earned three battle stars for Cold War service.

Service in Royal Thai Navy 
She was renamed HTMS Pangan (LST-13) once acquired by the navy. She was homeported in Phra Samut Chedi alongside HTMS Lanta and HTMS Chang.

The ship was retired from the Royal Thai Navy in 2008 and used as a training ship alongside other LSTs.

She arrived in Koh Phangan on 21 January 2011 to be converted into museum ship.

Awards 
LST-1134 have earned the following awards:

 American Campaign Medal
 Asiatic-Pacific Campaign Medal
 World War II Victory Medal 
 Navy Occupation Service Medal (with Asia clasp) 
 National Defense Service Medal
 Korean Service Medal (3 battle stars)
 United Nations Service Medal 
 Republic of Korea War Service Medal (retroactive)

References 

LST-542-class tank landing ships
Stark County, Illinois
1945 ships
Ships transferred from the United States Navy to the Royal Thai Navy
World War II amphibious warfare vessels of the United States
Korean War amphibious warfare vessels of the United States
Museum ships in Thailand
LST-542-class tank landing ships of the Royal Thai Navy